Eleazar Albin (fl. 1690 – c. 1742) was an English naturalist and watercolourist illustrator who wrote and illustrated a number of books including A Natural History of English Insects (1720), A Natural History of Birds (1731–38) and A Natural History of Spiders and other Curious Insects (1736). He has been described as one of the "great entomological book illustrators of the 18th century".

Biography

Nothing is known of Albin's early life, though he may have been German-born; he claimed to have been in Jamaica in 1701. In 1708 he is known to have been married and living in Piccadilly, London. According to autobiographical details in A Natural History of English Insects, Albin taught watercolour painting before being instructed in natural history by silk weaver and naturalist Joseph Dandridge.

A Natural History of Birds has coloured engravings by Albin and his daughter Elizabeth Albin. In that book Albin writes "As for the paintings, they are all done from life, with all the exactness I could either with my own hand, or my daughters, whom I have taught to draw and paint after the life".

In his work on birds he describes the wood-crow (northern bald ibis) from a stuffed specimen, being probably the last description of this bird made while the species was still extant in Europe.

Works
E. Albin. A natural history of English insects. Illustrated with a hundred copper plates, curiously engraven from the life: and (for those who desire it) exactly coloured by the author (London, William Innys, 1720).

E. Albin. A natural history of spiders, and other curious insects (London, Tilly, 1736).
E. Albin. A Natural History of English Songbirds (1737).  With coloured plates.
R. North & E. Albin. The History of Esculent Fish" (1794).

References

Sources

 Osborne, Peter (2004): "Albin, Eleazar (d. 1742?)", Oxford Dictionary of National Biography'', Oxford University Press.

External links
 Digitized works by Eleazar Albin in the Biodiversity Heritage Library

English naturalists
1680 births
1742 deaths
English watercolourists
English illustrators
English non-fiction writers
British bird artists
English male non-fiction writers